John Ernest Mills (3 September 1905 – 11 December 1972), known as Jackie Mills, was a New Zealand cricketer who played in seven Test matches between 1930 and 1933.

Cricket career
Jackie Mills's father George was an all-rounder who played for Auckland in the 1890s and 1900s and was the groundsman at Eden Park in Auckland.

A left-handed opening batsman, Mills played for Auckland from 1924–25 to 1937–38, and toured England with the New Zealand teams of 1927 and 1931, scoring over 1000 runs on each tour. In an Auckland senior club match for Eden against University in 1924–25, Mills and Hector Gillespie shared an opening stand of 441. In the first match of the 1929-30 Plunket Shield season he scored 185, his highest score, in an innings victory for Auckland over Otago. He scored more than half of Auckland's total of 356, and more than Otago's two innings combined.

He was the first New Zealander to make a Test century on debut. He scored 117 for New Zealand against England at Basin Reserve, Wellington, New Zealand, in 1929–30, and he and Stewie Dempster put on 276 for the first wicket. However, Mills's next nine Test innings produced only 124 runs.

Dick Brittenden said: "Mills, lean and graceful, never seemed sufficiently robust for the demands of test cricket; he could probably claim to be the only test batsman who habitually wore wool, from neck to ankle, next to the skin. But if his batting looked effete, it was effective. A most graceful driver and cutter, he had the left-hander's penchant for the hook. Spare and frail he was, but there was tremendous power which came from some hidden source; he was New Zealand's nearest approach to Woolley."

References

External links
 

1905 births
1972 deaths
New Zealand Test cricketers
Cricketers from Dunedin
Cricketers who made a century on Test debut
New Zealand cricketers
Pre-1930 New Zealand representative cricketers
Auckland cricketers